The Muna–Buton languages are a group of languages spoken on the islands of Muna and Buton off the coast of South East Sulawesi province, Indonesia. They belong to the Celebic subgroup of the Austronesian family.

Internal classification
The Ethnologue classifies the Muna–Buton languages as follows, based on van den Berg (2003) and Donohue (2004):

Nuclear Muna–Buton
Buton
East Buton: Lasalimu, Kumbewaha
West Buton: Cia-Cia
Munan
Busoa
Munic
Kaimbulawa
Western Munic: Liabuku, Muna (Wuna), Pancana, Kioko
Tukangbesi–Bonerate: Tukang Besi, Bonerate
In earlier classifications, Wolio, spoken in the city of Baubau (seat of the court of the former Sultanate of Buton) and its immediate surroundings, and Laiyolo, spoken in the southern part of Selayar Island, were also included in the Muna–Buton group, but Donohue (2004) has shown that they form a distinct subgroup of their own, Wotu–Wolio, which also includes Wotu, spoken at the northern shore of the Bone Gulf.

Reconstruction

Proto-Muna–Buton has been reconstructed by van den Berg (2003).

Phonology

Vocabulary
Van den Berg proposes around 30 lexical innovations for Proto-Muna–Buton, e.g.,  'cat',  'throw away',  'fish',  'eel',  'head',  'split open (fruit)',  'under'.

References

External links
"Muna-Buton" at Ethnologue (23rd ed, 2020).

 
Celebic languages